The 2015–16 San Antonio Spurs season was the 49th season of the franchise, 40th in the National Basketball Association (NBA) and 43rd in the San Antonio area.

Kawhi Leonard was selected to play in the 2016 NBA All-Star Game as a starter. This marked the first All-Star appearance for Leonard. With the acquisitions of David West and LaMarcus Aldridge, the Spurs finished with a 67–15 record, their best winning percentage in franchise history, earning them the Southwest Division title. The Spurs also set a franchise record for most wins in a season with 67 and tied the NBA record for most home wins in a season with 40 (tying the 1985–86 Boston Celtics 40–1 home record). On April 10, the Spurs' home winning streak came to an end with a loss to the defending NBA champion and eventual Western Conference champion Golden State Warriors.

In the first round of the 2016 NBA playoffs, the Spurs faced the injury depleted Memphis Grizzlies, and swept them in four games. However, in the Conference Semifinals, the team was defeated 2–4 by the Oklahoma City Thunder. They would become the first team since the 2007 Dallas Mavericks to finish with 67 wins and be eliminated before the Conference Finals.

After 19 years, this season marked the end of the Tim Duncan era as he retired from the NBA following this season. Believed by many as the greatest Spur of all time, Duncan led the Spurs to 5 championships, a playoff appearance in every season of his 19 years in the league, and after winning their 5th ring in 2014, became the second player, after John Salley, to win championships in 3 different decades. Duncan was also the last remaining active player to win a championship in the 1990s, as he led the Spurs to their first-ever championship title in 1999.

Draft

Roster

Pre-season

|- style="background:#fbb;"
| 1
| October 8
| @ Sacramento
| 92–95
| Kawhi Leonard (16)
| Butler, Leonard, Simmons (5)
| Patty Mills (5)
| Sleep Train Arena14,083
| 0–1
|- style="background:#fbb;"
| 2
| October 12
| @ Miami
| 94–97
| LaMarcus Aldridge (17)
| LaMarcus Aldridge (8)
| Tony Parker (5)
| American Airlines Arena19,600
| 0–2
|- style="background:#fbb;"
| 3
| October 14
| @ Atlanta
| 86–100
| Kawhi Leonard (20)
| Leonard, West (8)
| David West (3)
| Philips Arena11,801
| 0–3
|- style="background:#bfb;"
| 4
| October 18
| Detroit
| 96–92
| Kawhi Leonard (21)
| Tim Duncan (10)
| Anderson, Ginóbili (5)
| AT&T Center17,396
| 1–3
|- style="background:#fbb;"
| 5
| October 20
| Phoenix
| 84–104
| Kawhi Leonard (14)
| LaMarcus Aldridge (6)
| Tony Parker (8)
| AT&T Center15,774
| 1–4
|- style="background:#bfb;"
| 6
| October 23
| Houston
| 111–86
| Aldridge, Green (19)
| Boban Marjanović (6)
| Manu Ginóbili (6)
| AT&T Center18,059
| 2–4

Regular season

Standings

Division

Conference

Game log

|- style="background:#fbb;"
| 1
| October 28
| @ Oklahoma City
| 
| Kawhi Leonard (32)
| Leonard, Green (8)
| Manu Ginóbili (7)
| Chesapeake Energy Arena18,203
| 0–1
|- style="background:#bfb;"
| 2
| October 30
| Brooklyn
| 
| Kawhi Leonard (16)
| LaMarcus Aldridge (10)
| Aldridge, Ginóbili, Parker (4)
| AT&T Center18,418
| 1–1

|- style="background:#bfb;"
| 3
| November 1
| @ Boston
| 
| LaMarcus Aldridge (24)
| LaMarcus Aldridge (14)
| Aldridge, Duncan (5)
| TD Garden17,461
| 2–1
|- style="background:#bfb;"
| 4
| November 2
| @ New York
| 
| LaMarcus Aldridge (19)
| Kawhi Leonard (14)
| Tim Duncan (6)
| Madison Square Garden19,812
| 3–1
|- style="background:#fbb;"
| 5
| November 4
| @ Washington
| 
| Kawhi Leonard (23)
| LaMarcus Aldridge (14)
| Tim Duncan (5)
| Verizon Center17,721
| 3–2
|- style="background:#bfb;"
| 6
| November 7
| Charlotte
| 
| Kawhi Leonard (23)
| David West (9)
| Tony Parker (6)
| AT&T Center18,418
| 4–2
|- style="background:#bfb;"
| 7
| November 9
| @ Sacramento
| 
| Kawhi Leonard (24)
| Tim Duncan (14)
| Patty Mills (8)
| Sleep Train Arena17,317
| 5–2
|- style="background:#bfb;"
| 8
| November 11
| @ Portland
| 
| LaMarcus Aldridge (23)
| Kawhi Leonard (7)
| Tony Parker (5)
| Moda Center19,393
| 6–2
|- style="background:#bfb;"
| 9
| November 14
| Philadelphia
| 
| LaMarcus Aldridge (17)
| LaMarcus Aldridge (19)
| David West (5)
| AT&T Center18,717
| 7–2
|- style="background:#bfb;"
| 10
| November 16
| Portland
| 
| Kawhi Leonard (19)
| Duncan, Leonard (9)
| Tony Parker (7)
| AT&T Center18,418
| 8–2
|- style="background:#bfb;"
| 11
| November 18
| Denver
| 
| Tony Parker (25)
| LaMarcus Aldridge (12)
| Tony Parker (9)
| AT&T Center18,418
| 9–2
|- style="background:#fbb;"
| 12
| November 20
| @ New Orleans
| 
| Kawhi Leonard (22)
| LaMarcus Aldridge (11)
| Tony Parker (5)
| Smoothie King Center16,698
| 9–3
|- style="background:#bfb;"
| 13
| November 21
| Memphis
| 
| Kawhi Leonard (19)
| Tim Duncan (10)
| Tim Duncan (4)
| AT&T Center18,418
| 10–3
|- style="background:#bfb;"
| 14
| November 23
| Phoenix
| 
| Kawhi Leonard (24)
| Kawhi Leonard (13)
| Tony Parker (8)
| AT&T Center18,418
| 11–3
|- style="background:#bfb;"
| 15
| November 25
| Dallas
| 
| Kawhi Leonard (26)
| Tim Duncan (9)
| Tony Parker (8)
| AT&T Center18,418
| 12–3
|- style="background:#bfb;"
| 16
| November 27
| @ Denver
| 
| Kawhi Leonard (25)
| Kawhi Leonard (7)
| Kawhi Leonard (6)
| Pepsi Center17,121
| 13–3
|- style="background:#bfb;"
| 17
| November 28
| Atlanta
| 
| Kawhi Leonard (22)
| Tim Duncan (18)
| Tony Parker (6)
| AT&T Center18,418
| 14–3
|- style="background:#fbb;"
| 18
| November 30
| @ Chicago
| 
| Kawhi Leonard (25)
| Aldridge, Duncan (12)
| Tony Parker (9)
| United Center21,909
| 14–4

|- style="background:#bfb;"
| 19
| December 2
| Milwaukee
| 
| Tim Duncan (16)
| Tim Duncan (10)
| Kawhi Leonard (4)
| AT&T Center18,418
| 15–4
|- style="background:#bfb;"
| 20
| December 3
| @ Memphis
| 
| Kawhi Leonard (27)
| Tim Duncan (10)
| Duncan, Parker (5)
| FedEx Forum17,013
| 16–4
|- style="background:#bfb;"
| 21
| December 5
| Boston
| 
| LaMarcus Aldridge (18)
| Aldridge, Leonard (8)
| Tony Parker (6)
| AT&T Center18,418
| 17–4
|- style="background:#bfb;"
| 22
| December 7
| @ Philadelphia
| 
| LaMarcus Aldridge (26)
| LaMarcus Aldridge (9)
| Tony Parker (6)
| Wells Fargo Center14,449
| 18–4
|- style="background:#fbb;"
| 23
| December 9
| @ Toronto
| 
| Manu Ginóbili (17)
| Aldridge, Leonard (7)
| Patty Mills (6)
| Air Canada Centre19,800
| 18–5
|-style="background:#bfb;"
| 24
| December 11
| L.A. Lakers
| 
| LaMarcus Aldridge (24)
| Aldridge, Leonard (11)
| Ray McCallum (5)
| AT&T Center18,418
| 19–5
|-style="background:#bfb;"
| 25
| December 12
| @ Atlanta
| 
| Kawhi Leonard (22)
| Tim Duncan (10)
| Patty Mills (5)
| Philips Arena17,752
| 20–5
|- style="background:#bfb;"
| 26
| December 14
| Utah
| 
| Kawhi Leonard (22)
| LaMarcus Aldridge (8)
| Green, Parker (5)
| AT&T Center18,418
| 21–5
|- style="background:#bfb;"
| 27
| December 16
| Washington
| 
| Kawhi Leonard (27)
| David West (10)
| Tony Parker (10)
| AT&T Center18,418
| 22–5
|- style="background:#bfb;"
| 28
| December 18
| L. A. Clippers
| 
| LaMarcus Aldridge (26)
| LaMarcus Aldridge (13)
| Diaw, Ginobili (5)
| AT&T Center18,418
| 23–5
|- style="background:#bfb;"
| 29
| December 21
| Indiana
| 
| Kawhi Leonard (24)
| LaMarcus Aldridge (9)
| Kawhi Leonard (5)
| AT&T Center18,418
| 24–5
|- style="background:#bfb;"
| 30
| December 23
| @ Minnesota
| 
| Kawhi Leonard (19)
| LaMarcus Aldridge (8)
| Tony Parker (6)
| Target Center16,788
| 25–5
|- style="background:#fbb;"
| 31
| December 25
| @ Houston
| 
| Kawhi Leonard (20)
| Tim Duncan (11)
| Kawhi Leonard (4)
| Toyota Center18,319
| 25–6
|- style="background:#bfb;"
| 32
| December 26
| Denver
| 
| Kawhi Leonard (20)
| LaMarcus Aldridge (9)
| David West (6)
| AT&T Center18,420
| 26–6
|- style="background:#bfb;"
| 33
| December 28
| Minnesota
| 
| Marjanović, Leonard (17)
| Kawhi Leonard (11)
| Tony Parker (7)
| AT&T Center18,493
| 27–6
|- style="background:#bfb;"
| 34
| December 30
| Phoenix
| 
| LaMarcus Aldridge (21)
| Aldridge, Marjanović (12)
| Tony Parker (7)
| AT&T Center18,418
| 28–6

|- style="background:#bfb;"
| 35
| January 2
| Houston
| 
| LaMarcus Aldridge (24)
| LaMarcus Aldridge (9)
| Tony Parker (10)
| AT&T Center18,652
| 29–6
|-style="background:#bfb;"
| 36
| January 4
| @ Milwaukee
| 
| Kawhi Leonard (24)
| LaMarcus Aldridge (11)
| Manu Ginóbili (7)
| BMO Harris Bradley Center14,718
| 30–6
|- style="background:#bfb;"
| 37
| January 6
| Utah
| 
| Tim Duncan (18)
| LaMarcus Aldridge (13)
| Duncan, Diaw (6)
| AT&T Center18,418
| 31–6
|-style="background:#bfb;"
| 38
| January 8
| New York
| 
| Kawhi Leonard (19)
| Kawhi Leonard (12)
| Tony Parker (8)
| AT&T Center18,420
| 32–6
|- style="background:#bfb;"
| 39
| January 11
| @ Brooklyn
| 
| LaMarcus Aldridge (25)
| LaMarcus Aldridge (11)
| Manu Ginóbili (5)
| Barclays Center15,214
| 33–6
|- style="background:#bfb;"
| 40
| January 12
| @ Detroit
| 
| Tony Parker (31)
| LaMarcus Aldridge (13)
| Danny Green (5)
| Palace of Auburn Hills14,273
| 34–6
|- style="background:#bfb;"
| 41
| January 14
| Cleveland
| 
| Tony Parker (24)
| Kawhi Leonard (10)
| Kawhi Leonard (5)
| AT&T Center18,418
| 35–6
|- style="background:#bfb;"
| 42
| January 17
| Dallas
| 
| LaMarcus Aldridge (23)
| Aldridge, Green (7)
| Tony Parker (7)
| AT&T Center18,418
| 36–6
|- style="background:#bfb;"
| 43
| January 21
| @ Phoenix
| 
| Kawhi Leonard (21)
| Boban Marjanović (13)
| Boris Diaw (4)
| Talking Stick Resort Arena16,779
| 37–6
|- style="background:#bfb;"
| 44
| January 22
| @ L. A. Lakers
| 
| Manu Ginóbili (20)
| David West (7)
| Diaw, Ginobili (4)
| Staples Center18,997
| 38–6
|- style="background:#fbb;"
| 45
| January 25
| @ Golden State
| 
| Kawhi Leonard (16)
| Boban Marjanović (6)
| Ginobili, Green, Parker (3)
| Oracle Arena19,596
| 38–7
|- style="background:#bfb;"
| 46
| January 27
| Houston
| 
| LaMarcus Aldridge (25)
| Aldridge, Marjanović (10)
| Tony Parker (7)
| AT&T Center18,418
| 39–7
|- style="background:#fbb;"
| 47
| January 30
| @ Cleveland
| 
| Kawhi Leonard (24)
| Kawhi Leonard (6)
| Tony Parker (6)
| Quicken Loans Arena20,562
| 39–8

|- style="background:#bfb;"
| 48
| February 1
| Orlando
| 
| LaMarcus Aldridge (28)
| Diaw, Green (6)
| Tony Parker (6)
| AT&T Center18,418
| 40–8
|- style="background:#bfb;"
| 49
| February 3
| New Orleans
| 
| LaMarcus Aldridge (36)
| Danny Green (7)
| Tony Parker (8)
| AT&T Center18,418
| 41–8
|- style="background:#bfb;"
| 50
| February 5
| @ Dallas
| 
| Kawhi Leonard (23)
| LaMarcus Aldridge (10)
| Boris Diaw (4)
| American Airlines Center20,404
| 42–8
|- style="background:#bfb;"
| 51
| February 6
| L. A. Lakers
| 
| LaMarcus Aldridge (26)
| Kawhi Leonard (13)
| David West (5)
| AT&T Center18,418
| 43–8
|- style="background:#bfb;"
| 52
| February 9
| @ Miami
| 
| LaMarcus Aldridge (28)
| Kawhi Leonard (9)
| Tony Parker (5)
| American Airlines Arena19,723
| 44–8
|- style="background:#bfb;"
| 53
| February 10
| @ Orlando
| 
| Kawhi Leonard (29)
| Aldridge, Duncan, Leonard (7)
| Patty Mills (7)
| Amway Center17,467
| 45–8
|- align="center"
|colspan="9" bgcolor="#bbcaff"|All-Star Break
|- style="background:#fbb;"
| 54
| February 18
| @ L. A. Clippers
| 
| Tony Parker (14)
| Tim Duncan (6)
| Tony Parker, West (4)
| Staples Center19,410
| 45–9
|- style="background:#bfb;"
| 55
| February 19
| @ L. A. Lakers
| 
| Tony Parker (25)
| Tim Duncan (13)
| Tony Parker (9)
| Staples Center18,997
| 46–9
|- style="background:#bfb;"
| 56
| February 21
| @ Phoenix
| 
| Tony Parker (22)
| LaMarcus Aldridge (10)
| Patty Mills (5)
| Talking Stick Resort Arena16,224
| 47–9
|- style="background:#bfb;"
| 57
| February 24
| @ Sacramento
| 
| Tony Parker (19)
| LaMarcus Aldridge (9)
| Tony Parker (6)
| Sleep Train Arena17,317
| 48–9
|- style="background:#bfb;"
| 58
| February 25
| @ Utah
| 
| Kawhi Leonard (29)
| Tim Duncan (11)
| Tony Parker (6)
| Vivint Smart Home Arena19,911
| 49–9
|- style="background:#bfb;"
| 59
| February 27
| @ Houston
| 
| Kawhi Leonard (27)
| LaMarcus Aldridge (16)
| Tim Duncan (6)
| Toyota Center18,240
| 50–9

|- style="background:#bfb;"
| 60
| March 2
| Detroit
| 
| Kawhi Leonard (27)
| LaMarcus Aldridge (10)
| Patty Mills (7)
| AT&T Center18,418
| 51–9
|- style="background:#bfb;"
| 61
| March 3
| @ New Orleans
| 
| Kawhi Leonard (30)
| Kawhi Leonard (11)
| Patty Mills (8)
| Smoothie King Center17,781
| 52–9
|- style="background:#bfb;"
| 62
| March 5
| Sacramento
| 
| Kawhi Leonard (25)
| Kawhi Leonard (13)
| Tony Parker (7)
| AT&T Center18,418
| 53–9
|-style="background:#fbb;"
| 63
| March 7
| @ Indiana
| 
| Aldridge, Leonard (23)
| Tim Duncan (14)
| Tony Parker (5)
| Bankers Life Fieldhouse16,742
| 53–10
|- style="background:#bfb;"
| 64
| March 8
| @ Minnesota
| 
| LaMarcus Aldridge (29)
| Boban Marjanović (8)
| Andre Miller (5)
| Target Center14,093
| 54–10
|- style="background:#bfb;"
| 65
| March 10
| Chicago
| 
| Kawhi Leonard (29)
| LaMarcus Aldridge (10)
| Tony Parker (12)
| AT&T Center18,418
| 55–10
|- style="background:#bfb;"
| 66
| March 12
| Oklahoma City
| 
| Kawhi Leonard (26)
| LaMarcus Aldridge (9)
| Tony Parker (4)
| AT&T Center18,418
| 56–10
|- style="background:#bfb;"
| 67
| March 15
| L. A. Clippers
| 
| Kawhi Leonard (20)
| Tim Duncan (7)
| Patty Mills (6)
| AT&T Center18,418
| 57–10
|- style="background:#bfb;"
| 68
| March 17
| Portland
| 
| Aldridge, Leonard (22)
| Tim Duncan (7)
| Tony Parker (16)
| AT&T Center18,418
| 58–10
|- style="background:#bfb;"
| 69
| March 19
| Golden State
| 
| Kawhi Leonard (26)
| LaMarcus Aldridge (14)
| Tony Parker (6)
| AT&T Center18,825
| 59–10
|- style="background:#fbb;"
| 70
| March 21
| @ Charlotte
| 
| Tony Parker (19)
| LaMarcus Aldridge (12)
| Tony Parker (7)
| Time Warner Cable Arena18,260
| 59–11
|- style="background:#bfb;"
| 71
| March 23
| Miami
| 
| Kawhi Leonard (32)
| Tim Duncan (9)
| Tony Parker (5)
| AT&T Center18,418
| 60–11
|- style="background:#bfb;"
| 72
| March 25
| Memphis
| 
| LaMarcus Aldridge (32)
| LaMarcus Aldridge (12)
| Tim Duncan (7)
| AT&T Center18,418
| 61–11
|- style="background:#fbb;"
| 73
| March 26
| @ Oklahoma City
| 
| David West (17)
| Andre Miller (8)
| David West (3)
| Chesapeake Energy Arena18,203
| 61–12
|- style="background:#bfb;"
| 74
| March 28
| @ Memphis
| 
| LaMarcus Aldridge (31)
| LaMarcus Aldridge (13)
| Kyle Anderson (7)
| FedExForum17,133
| 62–12
|- style="background:#bfb;"
| 75
| March 30
| New Orleans
| 
| Manu Ginóbili (20)
| Tim Duncan (9)
| Tony Parker (6)
| AT&T Center18,418
| 63–12

|- style="background:#bfb;"
| 76
| April 2
| Toronto
| 
| Kawhi Leonard (33)
| LaMarcus Aldridge (15)
| Kawhi Leonard (7)
| AT&T Center18,418
| 64–12
|- style="background:#bfb;"
| 77
| April 5
| @ Utah
| 
| Kawhi Leonard (18)
| Kawhi Leonard (8)
| Tony Parker (6)
| Vivint Smart Home Arena19,381
| 65–12
|- style="background:#fbb;"
| 78
| April 7
| @ Golden State
| 
| Kawhi Leonard (23)
| Kyle Anderson (11)
| David West (7)
| Oracle Arena19,596
| 65–13
|- style="background:#fbb;"
| 79
| April 8
| @ Denver
| 
| Tim Duncan (21)
| Duncan, West (7)
| Kevin Martin (7)
| Pepsi Center16,347
| 65–14
|- style="background:#fbb;"
| 80
| April 10
| Golden State
| 
| LaMarcus Aldridge (24)
| Kawhi Leonard (13)
| Kawhi Leonard (5)
| AT&T Center18,658
| 65–15
|- style="background:#bfb;"
| 81
| April 12
| Oklahoma City
| 
| Kawhi Leonard (26)
| Tim Duncan (9)
| Kawhi Leonard (5)
| AT&T Center18,765
| 66–15
|- style="background:#bfb;"
| 82
| April 13
| @ Dallas
| 
| Boban Marjanović (22)
| Boban Marjanović (12)
| Boris Diaw (7)
| American Airlines Center20,346
| 67–15

Playoffs

Game log

|- style="background:#bfb;"
| 1
| April 17
| Memphis
| 
| Kawhi Leonard (20)
| Tim Duncan (11)
| Tony Parker (6)
| AT&T Center18,418
| 1–0
|- style="background:#bfb;"
| 2
| April 19
| Memphis
| 
| Patty Mills (16)
| Tim Duncan (9)
| Duncan, Parker (4)
| AT&T Center18,418
| 2–0
|- style="background:#bfb;"
| 3
| April 22
| @ Memphis
| 
| Kawhi Leonard (32)
| LaMarcus Aldridge (10)
| Tony Parker (7)
| FedExForum18,119
| 3–0
|- style="background:#bfb;"
| 4
| April 24
| @ Memphis
| 
| Kawhi Leonard (21)
| LaMarcus Aldridge (10)
| Kawhi Leonard (4)
| FedExForum18,119
| 4–0

|- style="background:#bfb;"
| 1
| April 30
| Oklahoma City
| 
| LaMarcus Aldridge (38)
| Kyle Anderson (7)
| Tony Parker (12)
| AT&T Center18,418
| 1–0
|- style="background:#fbb;"
| 2
| May 2
| Oklahoma City
| 
| LaMarcus Aldridge (41)
| Tim Duncan (9)
| Tony Parker (6)
| AT&T Center18,418
| 1–1
|- style="background:#bfb;"
| 3
| May 6
| @ Oklahoma City
| 
| Kawhi Leonard (31)
| Kawhi Leonard (11)
| Tony Parker (5)
| Chesapeake Energy Arena18,203
| 2–1
|- style="background:#fbb;"
| 4
| May 8
| @ Oklahoma City
| 
| Tony Parker (22)
| David West (7)
| Mills, Parker (3)
| Chesapeake Energy Arena18,203
| 2–2
|- style="background:#fbb;"
| 5
| May 10
| Oklahoma City
| 
| Kawhi Leonard (26)
| LaMarcus Aldridge (9)
| Tony Parker (5)
| AT&T Center18,418
| 2–3
|- style="background:#fbb;"
| 6
| May 12
| @ Oklahoma City
| 
| Kawhi Leonard (22)
| LaMarcus Aldridge (14)
| Kawhi Leonard (5)
| Chesapeake Energy Arena18,203
| 2–4

Player statistics

Regular season

Playoffs

Transactions

Trades

Free agents

Re-signed

Additions

Subtractions

References

San Antonio Spurs seasons
San Antonio Spurs
San Antonio Spurs
San Antonio Spurs